Daniel Reid Simpson (February 20, 1927 – January 24, 2015) was an American jurist and politician.

Born in Glen Alpine, North Carolina, Simpson served in the United States Army on the Pacific Front during World War II. He received his bachelor's and law degrees from Wake Forest University. Simpson practiced law and served on the Glen Alpine City Council and as mayor and was a Republican. He also served as judge of the Burke County, North Carolina Criminal Court. Simpson served in the North Carolina House of Representatives in 1957, 1961, and 1963. Simpson then served in the North Carolina State Senate from 1985 to 1995.

After his retirement from political life, Simpson's home town of Glen Alpine named their baseball field "Simpson Field", in his honor.

Notes

1927 births
2015 deaths
People from Burke County, North Carolina
Wake Forest University alumni
Wake Forest University School of Law alumni
North Carolina state court judges
Mayors of places in North Carolina
North Carolina city council members
Republican Party North Carolina state senators
Republican Party members of the North Carolina House of Representatives
20th-century American judges